"She's Not Me" is a song by Swedish artist Zara Larsson

She's Not Me may also refer to:
 "She's Not Me", a song on the Madonna album Hard Candy
 "She's Not Me", a song on the Jenny Lewis album The Voyager

See also
 Not Me (disambiguation)